Christine Laszar (19 December 1931 – 17 November 2021) was a German actress.

Biography
Laszar was born Christine "Christel" Lazarus in Ortelsburg, East Prussia, Prussia, Germany (today Szczytno, Poland).

She was educated at the West Berlin Max Reinhardtstageschool and began her career at the Renaissance-Theater (Berlin), the "Die Stachelschweine" and the Munich "Schaubude". She also appeared at the Volksbühne Berlin (East Berlin).

In the 1950s, she married Rudolf Schündler (divorced). In 1958, she moved to East Germany and married Karl-Eduard von Schnitzler (the marriage was divorced shortly after). Laszar appeared in several movies of the DEFA.
 
In the early 1970s, she worked at the Deutscher Fernsehfunk and retired for health reasons in the 1980s.

Laszar died in Berlin on 17 November 2021, at the age of 89.

Filmography

References

External links

1931 births
2021 deaths
People from Szczytno
People from East Prussia
German stage actresses
German television actresses
German film actresses
20th-century German actresses
East German actors
East German women